The Evangelical Baptist Convention of Argentina also known as Evangelical Baptist Confederation is a Baptist Christian denomination in Argentina. It is affiliated with the Baptist World Alliance. The headquarters is in Buenos Aires.

History

The Convention has its origins in the establishment of the first Baptist Church in Santa Fe (Argentina) by Paul Besson, a Swiss missionary in 1881, and an American mission of the International Mission Board in 1903. It is founded in 1908.
 
According to a denomination census released in 2020, it claimed 670 churches and 85,000 members.

School
The convention has an affiliated theological institute, the Seminario Internacional Teológico Bautista de Buenos Aires founded in 1953.

See also
 Bible
 Born again
 Baptist beliefs
 Worship service (evangelicalism)
 Jesus Christ
 Believers' Church

References

External links
Official Website 	

 
Baptist denominations in South America
Baptist Christianity in Argentina